Bin Laden: The Man Who Declared War on America is a New York Times Bestseller by Yossef Bodansky, the former Director of the Congressional Task Force on Terrorism and Unconventional Warfare.

The book provides a full account of the rise of Osama bin Laden and discusses Islamism. Bodansky concludes "Ultimately, the quintessence of bin Laden's threat is his being a cog, albeit an important one, in a large system that will outlast his own demise -- state-sponsored international terrorism." The book details support from Sudan and Afghanistan but claims that perhaps bin Laden's biggest supporter is Iran. Bodansky also alleges a cooperative relationship between Saddam Hussein and al-Qaeda. The book's success as best-seller was amid controversy of a purported political agenda therein.

References

External links
Excerpt published in USA Today

Books about terrorism
1999 non-fiction books
Works about Osama bin Laden